Adelaide Hockey Club is a hockey club in Adelaide, South Australia. As a district club serving the Adelaide area, Adelaide operates from the edge of the parklands. Adelaide Hockey Club fields teams in all senior and junior grades, men's and women's. The club has over 400 members across the Junior and Senior Competitions. The club runs the largest Minkey competition in South Australia involving over 250 primary school children from schools across the larger Adelaide metropolitan area.

History

The Adelaide Hockey Club was formed in late 1981, as a result of an internal presidential dispute at Forestville Hockey Club. After a time of sharing playing fields and change rooms, Sturt and Aroha clubs amalgamated with the former Forestville players to form a new club. The home grass fields and club rooms used to be located on the corner of Beaumont Road and Greenhill Road, now a site for junior and half-field competitions. The current home ground is located on at the corner of Peacock and Greenhill Road and includes a full-sized turf pitch and a smaller turf pitch for the junior U9 competition.

The Club, as part of a Consortium, shares its facilities with Pulteney Grammar School and Tennis Seniors SA.

Club Awards

 Hockey SA – Club of the Year (2018)
 Active Ambassador Sports Award – Junior Club of the Year (2018)
 Hockey SA – Japan Cup (2017,2018,2019)

Club song

The Club song is usually sung as a victory celebration. It is sung to the tune "Lily of Laguna" (the same tune used by the AFL Carlton Football Club).

Australian representatives

 Karri McMahon (2012–current)
 Georgie Parker (2011–current)
 Elise Stacy (2011)
 Grant Schubert (2003)
 Donna Lee-Patrick (2003–06)
 Alison Peek (1989–2000)
 Juliet Haslam (1989–2000)
 Paul Lewis (1982)
 Kerri Proud (1982)

See also
 List of sporting clubs in Adelaide
 List of South Australian field hockey clubs

External links
Hockey SA website
[adelaidehockeyclub.com.au Adelaide Hockey Club's Website]

Australian field hockey clubs
1981 establishments in Australia
Field hockey clubs established in 1981
Sporting clubs in Adelaide